Miklós Németh (born 15 April 1910, date of death unknown) was a Hungarian cyclist. He competed in the tandem and team pursuit events at the 1936 Summer Olympics.

References

External links
 

1910 births
Year of death missing
Hungarian male cyclists
Olympic cyclists of Hungary
Cyclists at the 1936 Summer Olympics
Place of birth missing